Trav'lin' Light is the sixth studio album by the American hip-hop artist Queen Latifah. The album was released in the United States on September 25, 2007 by Verve Records. The album reached No. 1 on the Billboard Jazz Albums chart.

Overview
Following The Dana Owens Album released in 2004, this is Latifah's second singing album containing cover versions of jazz standards. The album spent three weeks atop the Billboard Jazz Albums chart.

The album cut "I'm Gonna Live Till I Die" won the 2008 Grammy Award for Best Instrumental Arrangement Accompanying Vocalist(s), which was presented to its arranger, John Clayton. Trav'lin' Light was also nominated for Best Traditional Pop Vocal Album.

The album's first song and subsequently first single, "Poetry Man" is a cover of Phoebe Snow's song of the same name.

Track listing
"Poetry Man" (Phoebe Snow) – 4:40
"Georgia Rose" featuring Stevie Wonder (Jimmy Flynn, Harry Rosenthal, Alex Sullivan) – 3:43
"Quiet Nights of Quiet Stars" (Antonio Carlos Jobim, Gene Lees) – 3:54
"Don't Cry Baby" (Saul Bernice, James P. Johnson, Stella Unger) – 2:53
"I Love Being Here with You" (Peggy Lee, William Schluger) – 2:52
"I'm Gonna Live Till I Die" (Mann Curtis, Al Hoffman, Walter Kent) – 2:09
"Trav'lin' Light" (Johnny Mercer, Jimmy Mundy, Trummy Young) – 4:05
"I Want a Little Sugar in My Bowl" (Nina Simone) – 3:06
"I'm Not in Love" (Eric Stewart, Graham Gouldman) – 4:47
"What Love Has Joined Together" (Smokey Robinson, Bobby Rogers) – 3:40
"How Long (Betcha Got a Chick on the Side)" (Anita Pointer, June Pointer, Patricia Pointer, Ruth Pointer, David Rubinson) – 5:41
"Gone Away" (Donny Hathaway, Leroy Hutson, Curtis Mayfield) – 5:50
"I Know Where I've Been" (from Hairspray) (Marc Shaiman, Scott Wittman) – 4:13
"Java Jive" (exclusive track available only on copies purchased on QueenLatifah.com)

Wal-Mart edition
"Every Woman Is a Queen" – 1:53

"Every Woman Is a Queen" can also be heard in her CoverGirl commercials.

Personnel

Musicians
George Duke - keyboards (on tracks 1, 5, 6, 9, 12)
Joe Sample - piano (2, 7, 8)
Paul Jackson, Jr. - guitar (1, 4, 9–12)
Mike Valerio - bass (1, 3, 10)
Christian McBride - bass (2, 5–8)
Stevie Wonder - harmonica (2)

Production
Ron Fair - producer (1, 3, 4, 9–12)
Tommy LiPuma - producer (2, 5–8)
Marc Shaiman - producer (13)
Monica Lynch, Queen Latifah, Shakim Compere - executive producers
John Clayton (2, 5–8), Tommy Vicari (3, 9, 12), "Angry" Mike Eleopoulos (4, 10), Peter Mokram (1), Jack Joseph Puig (11) - mixing 
Doug Sax - mastering

Charts

Release history

References

2007 albums
Albums produced by Ron Fair
Albums produced by Tommy LiPuma
Covers albums
Vocal jazz albums
Queen Latifah albums
Verve Records albums
Traditional pop albums